Will Schutt (born 1981 New York City) is the author of Westerly (Yale University Press, 2013), selected by Carl Phillips as the winner of the 2012 Yale Series of Younger Poets award.

Life
He is a graduate of Oberlin College and Hollins University, where he received his MFA.
He is also the recipient of fellowships from the James Merrill House, the Stadler Center for Poetry, the Reginald S. Tickner
Writing Fellowship,  the Jeannette Haien Ballard Prize and the Amy Lowell Poetry Travelling Fellowship.  He has been awarded fellowships to attend the Sewanee Writers' Conference and the Bread Loaf Writers' Conference.

For his translations of Italian poet Edoardo Sanguineti he received grants from the National Endowment for the Arts and PEN/America.

His poems and translations have appeared in Agni, Blackbird, FIELD, Narrative, The New Republic, The Southern Review, Kenyon Review Online and elsewhere.

He is the son of American novelist Christine Schutt.

He currently lives with his wife in Baltimore, Maryland.

Works
 Westerly'', New Haven, Conn. Yale Univ. Press 2013. ,

References

External links
 Will Schutt's tumblr

1981 births
Writers from New York City
Oberlin College alumni
Hollins University alumni
Living people
Yale Younger Poets winners
Poets from New York (state)
American male poets
21st-century American poets
21st-century American male writers